Joseph Pugsley (10 May 1885 – 13 June 1976) was a Welsh dual-code international rugby union, and professional rugby league footballer who played in the 1900s and 1910s. He played representative level rugby union (RU) for Wales and Glamorgan County RFC, and at club level for Grange Stars RFC, Cardiff RFC and London Welsh RFC, as a hooker, i.e. number 2, and representative level rugby league (RL) for Wales, and at club level for Salford, as a forward (prior to the specialist positions of), during the era of contested scrums.

Background
Joe Pugsley was born in Swansea, Wales, and he died aged 91 in Cardiff, Wales.

International honours
Joe Pugsley won caps for Wales (RU) while at Cardiff RFC in 1910 against England, Scotland, and Ireland, and in 1911 against England, Scotland, France, and Ireland, and won a cap for Wales (RL) while at Salford in 1911.

References

1885 births
1976 deaths
Cardiff RFC players
Dual-code rugby internationals
London Welsh RFC players
Glamorgan County RFC players
Rugby league players from Swansea
Rugby league forwards
Rugby union hookers
Rugby union players from Swansea
Salford Red Devils players
Wales international rugby union players
Wales national rugby league team players
Welsh rugby league players
Welsh rugby union players